Hillel J. Einhorn (June 12, 1941 – January 8, 1987) was an American psychologist who played a key role in the development of the field of behavioral decision theory. Einhorn earned BA and MA degrees at Brooklyn College, married Susan Michaels in 1966, and received his PhD in psychology from Wayne State University in 1969 under the supervision of Alan Bass. In 1969, Einhorn joined the faculty of the Graduate School of Business (now the Booth School of Business) at the University of Chicago. He was promoted to professor in 1976 and appointed to the Wallace W. Booth professorship in 1986. In addition to his research contributions, Einhorn restructured the behavioral science curriculum by providing a specific focus on behavioral decision theory, and founded the Center for Decision Research at the University of Chicago in 1977. Einhorn died of Hodgkin's disease on January 8, 1987, at the age of 45.

Research 
Einhorn studied many different aspects of decision making, including clinical judgment, effects of imperfect feedback, group judgments, causal reasoning, belief updating, and risky choice. He further contributed to the debate on the meaning of rationality, taking a position that favored appreciating the advantages of different views. His work on decision making also had a practical perspective. He favored simple methods that people could use effectively. The Society for Judgment and Decision Making's Hillel J. Einhorn New Investigator Award is named for him.

Selected publications

Further reading

References 

20th-century American psychologists
Brooklyn College alumni
Wayne State University alumni
University of Chicago faculty
1941 births
1987 deaths